Mary Struthers (born July 21, 1950) is an American former professional tennis player.

A San Diego native, Struthers was active on tour in the 1970s, making main draw appearances at the French Open and Wimbledon. She featured in the second round of the 1976 US Open, where she was beaten by Glynis Coles. In 1977 she was a singles finalist at the Swedish Open in Båstad.

References

External links
 
 

1950 births
Living people
American female tennis players
Tennis players from San Diego